The Dual Role of Bob Brookmeyer is an album by jazz trombonist and pianist Bob Brookmeyer recorded in 1954 and 1955 for the Prestige label.

Reception

The Allmusic review by Scott Yanow stated: "Although the overall set is not all that essential, the music is pleasing and reasonably creative".

Track listing
All compositions by Bob Brookmeyer except as indicated
 "Rocky Scotch" – 4:40   
 "Under the Lilacs" – 5:07
 "They Say It's Wonderful" (Irving Berlin) – 5:49
 "Potrezebie" (Jimmy Raney) – 4:49
 "Revelation" (Gerry Mulligan) – 5:46
 "Star Eyes" (Gene de Paul, Don Raye) – 4:29
 "Nobody's Heart" (Lorenz Hart, Richard Rodgers) – 4:25
 "Loup-Garou" (Teddy Charles) – 4:38  
Recorded in New York City on January 6, 1954 (tracks 5–8) and at Van Gelder Studio in Hackensack, New Jersey on June 30, 1955 (tracks 1–4)

Personnel 
Bob Brookmeyer – valve trombone, piano
Jimmy Raney – guitar (tracks 1–4)
Teddy Charles – vibraphone (tracks 5–8)
Teddy Kotick – bass
Mel Lewis (tracks 1–4), Ed Shaughnessy (tracks 5–8) – drums
Nancy Overton – vocals (track 7)

References 

1956 albums
Prestige Records albums
Bob Brookmeyer albums
Albums produced by Bob Weinstock
Albums recorded at Van Gelder Studio